was a village located in Seta District, Gunma Prefecture, Japan.

On June 13, 2005, Niisato, along with the village of Kurohone (also from Seta District), was merged into the expanded city of Kiryū.

Dissolved municipalities of Gunma Prefecture
Kiryū, Gunma